Escape to the Dolomites (German: Flucht in die Dolomiten, Italian: Il prigioniero della montagna) is a 1955 Italian-West German drama film directed by and starring Luis Trenker. The cast also features Marianne Hold, Robert Freitag and Yvonne Sanson. It was shot at the Icet Studios in Milan and on location around Lake Garda and the Fiemme Valley in Trentino.

Synopsis
Giovanni Testa, a shipbuilder on Lake Garda is accused of murdering his brother, who refused to loan him some money in order to rescue his business.

Cast
 Luis Trenker as Giovanni Testa
 Marianne Hold as 	Graziella
 Robert Freitag as 	Sergio 
 Yvonne Sanson as Teresa 
 Enrico Glori as 	Bepo Ghezzi
 Umberto Sacripante as 	Padre di Graziella
 Marcello Giorda as Ragionier Massaro
 Hans Jamnig as 	Dolomites guide
 Vincenz Nacker as	Dolomites guide
 Phillip Prinoth as 	Dolomites guide
Flavio Pancherias 	Dolomites guide
 Hans Hammig as	Hans
 Vincenzo Nocker as 	Enzo
 Filippo Primod as 	Bepi
 Alda Quinti as	Figlia di Giovanni

References

Bibliography
 Reimer, Robert C. Cultural History Through a National Socialist Lens: Essays on the Cinema of the Third Reich. Camden House, 2002.

External links 
 

1955 films
1955 drama films
German drama films
West German films
Italian drama films
1950s German-language films
Films directed by Luis Trenker
1950s German films

de:Flucht in die Dolomiten
It:Il prigioniero della montagna